Lamsdorf may refer to:

 Lamsdorf (surname)
 German name of Łambinowice, Poland
 Stalag VIII-B, a notorious World War II German Army prisoner of war camp near Lamsdorf (Łambinowice)
 Lamsdorf Death March, one of several death marches at the end of World War II

See also 
 Lamm, a surname